Thaton Township is a township of Thaton District in the Mon State of Myanmar. It is the home of Thaton Institute of Agriculture. The capital is Thaton.

References

Townships of Mon State